Castorano is a comune (municipality) in the Province of Ascoli Piceno in the Italian region Marche, located about  south of Ancona and about  northeast of Ascoli Piceno.

Castorano borders the following municipalities: Ascoli Piceno, Castel di Lama, Colli del Tronto, Monsampolo del Tronto, Offida, Spinetoli.

Twin towns
 Dobrcz, Poland
 Noisy-sur-École, France

References

Cities and towns in the Marche